David James Porter (born March 8, 1966) is a United States circuit judge of the United States Court of Appeals for the Third Circuit.

Early life and education 

Porter was born on March 8, 1966, in Kittanning, Pennsylvania. He earned his Bachelor of Arts from Grove City College in 1988 and his Juris Doctor from the George Mason University School of Law (now Antonin Scalia Law School) in 1992, where he served as a notes editor for the George Mason Law Review.

Legal career 

After graduating from law school, Porter served as a law clerk to Judge D. Brooks Smith of the U.S. District Court for the Western District of Pennsylvania from 1992 to 1994. He then joined the law firm Buchanan, Ingersoll & Rooney, where practiced in the fields of regulatory, constitutional, and commercial litigation. 

From 1989 to 1992 he was a member of the Federalist Society; he rejoined in 1995 and has since been President of the Pittsburgh chapter.

In 2014 David J. Porter's name was discussed to be included to the White House as part of a package of judicial nominees between senators Bob Casey (D) and Pat Toomey (R). This was due to a tradition in Pennsylvania that divides judicial nominations on a 3-1 ratio when the state's two US senators are of the opposite party. This would allow The White House appointing one judge of the opposing party for three of their own party. Progressives in Pennsylvania scrambled to derail the deal because of David Porter's opposition to abortion rights, gay rights and gun control. As a result, his name was removed as part of a deal that would have resulted in him being nominated to the U.S. District Court for the Western District of Pennsylvania.

Federal judicial service 

On April 10, 2018, President Donald Trump announced his intent to nominate Porter to serve as a United States Circuit Judge of the United States Court of Appeals for the Third Circuit. Senator Bob Casey Jr. indicated his opposition to Porter's nomination, while Senator Pat Toomey voiced his support. On April 12, 2018, his nomination was sent to the Senate. He was nominated to the seat vacated by Judge D. Michael Fisher, who assumed senior status on February 1, 2017. On June 6, 2018, a hearing on his nomination was held before the Senate Judiciary Committee. On July 19, 2018, his nomination was reported out of committee by an 11–10 vote. On October 11, 2018, his nomination was confirmed by a 50–45 vote. He received his judicial commission on October 15, 2018.

References

External links 
 
 

1966 births
Living people
20th-century American lawyers
21st-century American lawyers
21st-century American judges
Antonin Scalia Law School alumni
Federalist Society members
Grove City College alumni
Judges of the United States Court of Appeals for the Third Circuit
Lawyers from Pittsburgh
Pennsylvania lawyers
Pennsylvania Republicans
People from Kittanning, Pennsylvania
United States court of appeals judges appointed by Donald Trump